Clitocybe parasitica is classified as a plant pathogen, because in the United States it causes Clitocybe Root Rot, affecting apple, peach, cherry, and oak species. First detected in Oklahoma in 1900 and described by E.M. Wilcox the following year, C. parasitica has been found afflicting orchard trees as far north as Oregon.

References

External links
 Index Fungorum
 USDA ARS Fungal Database

Fungal plant pathogens and diseases
parasitica